The name Emil, Emile, or Émile is a male given name, deriving from the Latin Aemilius of the gens Aemilia. The female given name is Emily.

List of people with the given name Emil 

Emil Aaltonen (1869—1949), Finnish industrialist and philanthropist
Emil Andersson (sport shooter) (born 1979), Swedish running target shooter
Emil Andersson (table tennis) (born 1993), Swedish table tennis player
Emil Artin (1898–1962), Austrian mathematician
Emil Atlason (born 1993), Icelandic footballer
Emil Bachrach (1874–1937), Russian-American entrepreneur
Emil Barth (1879–1941), German Social Democratic party worker
Emil von Behring (1854–1917), German physiologist who received the 1901 Nobel Prize in Physiology or Medicine
Emil Bemström (born 1999), Swedish ice hockey player
Emil Berg, Swedish singer
Emil Berna (1907–2000), Swiss cinematographer
Emil Brown (born 1974), American baseball outfielder
Emil Brunner (1889–1966), Swiss theologian
Emil Calmanovici (1896–1956), Romanian businessman and communist militant
Emil Cedercreutz (1879–1949), Finnish sculptor
Emil Chuprenski (born 1960), Bulgarian boxer
Emil Cioran (1911–1995), French-Romanian writer
Emil Constantinescu (born 1939), President of Romania from 1996 to 2000
Emil Dardak (born 1984), Indonesian politician 
Emil (Fritz) Dietrich (1898–1948), German Nazi SS officer executed for war crimes
Emil Dill (1861–1938), Swiss painter
Emil Dimitriev (born 1979), interim Prime Minister of the Republic of Macedonia
Emil Dimitrov (1940–2005), Bulgarian singer
Emil Dorian (1893–1956), Romanian poet and prose writer
Emil Ekiyor Jr. (born 2000), American football player
Emil Fischer (1852–1919), German chemist and 1902 recipient of the Nobel Prize in Chemistry 
Emil Fjellström (1884–1944), Swedish actor 
Emil Forsberg (born 1991), Swedish international footballer
Emil Forselius (1974–2010), Swedish actor
Emil Gilels (1916–1985), Russian pianist
Emil Giurgiuca (1906–1992), Romanian poet
Emil Hácha (1872–1945), president of Czechoslovakia
Emil Hedvall (born 1983), Swedish footballer
Emil G. Hirsch (1852–1923), American rabbi
Emil Jannings (1884–1950), German actor
Emil Johnson (born c. 1966), drummer for Black Flag
Emil Jones (born 1935), American politician, president of the Illinois State Senate
Emil Jones, III (born 1978), American politician, Illinois Senate member
Emil Kapaun (1916–1951), Roman Catholic priest, US Army Chaplain who died in the Korean War, US Congressional Medal of Honor in 2013
Emil Karas (1933–1974), American football linebacker for the San Diego Chargers
Emil Theodor Kocher (1841–1917), Swiss physician and researcher, received the 1909 Nobel Prize in Physiology or Medicine 
Emil Kostadinov (born 1967), Bulgarian football player
Emil Kraepelin (1856–1926), German psychiatrist
Emil Lenz, Russian physicist and creator of Lenzs law
Emil Lerp (1886–1966), German businessman and inventor
Emil Lindenfeld (1905–1986), Hungarian-American oil-painter
Emil Ludwig (1881–1948), biographer
Emil Mangelsdorff (1925–2022), German jazz musician
Emil Martinec (born 1958), American theoretical physics professor
Emil Maurice (1897–1972), founding member of the SS and Hitler's personal chauffeur during the 1920s
Emil Minty (born 1972), Australian former child actor
Emil Molt (1876–1936), German industrialist, social reformer, and anthroposophist
Emil Nödtveidt (born 1976), Swedish guitarist in the band Deathstars
Emil Nolde (1867–1956), German painter and printmaker
Emil Paleček (1930–2018), Czech biochemist
Emil Leon Post (1897–1954), American mathematician
Emil Perttilä (1875–1933), Finnish politician
Emil Puhl (1889–1962), German Nazi-era economist and banking official
Emil Rebreanu (died 1917), Austro-Hungarian Romanian military officer
Emil Salim (born 1930), Indonesian politician and economist
Emil Savundra (1923–1976), British-Tamil businessman convicted of fraud
Emil Ludwig Schmidt (1837–1906), German anthropologist and ethnologist
Emil Schult (born 1946), German artist and collaborator with seminal electronic music group Kraftwerk
Emil Schulz (1938–2010), German boxer
Emil Seckel (1864–1924), German jurist and law historian
Emil Sitka (1914–1998), American actor
Emil Škoda (1839–1900), Czech engineer
Emil Steinberger (born 1933), Swiss comedian
Emil Stoyanov (born 1959), Bulgarian politician
Emil Szolomajer (born 1974), Romanian soccer player
Emil Unanue (born 1934), Cuban immunologist
Emil Unfried (1892–1949), German communist politician and businessman
Emil Urbel (born 1959), Estonian architect
Emil Utitz (1883–1956), Czech philosopher
Emil "Teddy" Vorster (1910–1976), German racing driver and entrepreneur
Emil Werstler, American guitarist for death metal band Dååth
Emil Wilbekin (born 1967), American journalist, media executive, stylist, content creator, culture critic, and human rights activist
Emil Wingstedt (born 1975), Swedish orienteering competitor
Emil Wojtaszek (1927–2017), Polish politician
Emil Zátopek (1922–2000), Czech long distance runner
Emil Zsigmondy (1861–1885), Austrian physician and mountain climber

List of people with the given name Emile or Émile 
Emile Abraham (born 1974), Trinidad and Tobago cyclist
Émile Baudot (1845–1903), French telegraph engineer and inventor
Émile Bilodeau (born 1996), French Canadian singer-songwriter
Émile Borel (1871–1956), French mathematician and politician
Émile Camut (1849–1905), French architect
Émile Cohl (1857–1938), French caricaturist and animator
Émile Durkheim (1858–1917), French sociologist
Emile Ford (born 1937), pop singer born in Saint Lucia
Émile de Girardin (1802–1881), French politician and journalist
Emile Griffith (1938-2013), US Virgin Islands boxer
Emile Habibi (1922–1996), Palestinian-Israeli writer and politician
Emile Haynie (born 1980), American record producer
Émile Henry (anarchist) (1872–1894), French anarchist bomber
Emile Heskey (born 1978), English footballer
Emile Hirsch (born 1985), American actor
Emile Kuri (1907–2000), Mexican-born American movie set decorator
Émile Lahoud (born 1936), former President of Lebanon
Emile Lahoud Jr. (born 1975), Lebanese businessman and the son of Émile Lahoud
Émile Legault (born 2000), Canadian soccer player
Émile Nelligan (1879-1941), French Canadian poet
Émile Renouf (1845–1894), French painter and draughtsman
Émile Ripert (1882-1948), French academic, poet, novelist and playwright
Emile Roemer (born 1962), Dutch politician
Emile St. Godard (1905–1948), Canadian dog sled racer
Emile Santiago (1899-1995), American costume designer
Émile Servan-Schreiber (1888-1967), French journalist
Emile Smith Rowe (born 2000), English footballer
Émile Waldteufel (1837–1915), French composer
Émile Zola (1840–1902), French novelist and journalist

Fictional characters
Emile, title character of Jean-Jacques Rousseau's Emile, or On Education
Emile, a character in Gambit
Emil, a survivor in the video game Identity V
Emil, an NPC who accompanies the main character in the game Nier
"Baby" Emile, a character in the film The Principal
Émile, a character in Ratatouille
Emile-A239, a Spartan in Halo: Reach
Emil Antonowsky, a villain in RoboCop
Emile de Becque, a character in South Pacific
Emil Bleehall, a character at the Adventurers Club
Emil Blonsky, alter ego of comic supervillain Abomination
Dr. Emil Breton, a character in Brian DePalma's Sisters
Emil Castagnier, main character of the video game Tales of Symphonia: Dawn of the New World
Emile Dufresne, a villain in Splinter Cell: Double Agent
Emil Eagle, a villain in the Disney comics' Donald Duck universe
Emile Antoon Khadaji, title character of the military science-fiction Matador series
Sergeant Emile Klinger, a character in North by Northwest
Emil Kolar, a supporting character in the pilot of The Sopranos. Emil Kolar is the first on-screen death in the series.
Dr. Emil Lang from the Robotech animated series
Emil Muzz, character played by Jack O'Halloran in Dragnet
Emil Narud, a scientist in StarCraft II
Dr. Emile Picani, a character in the Youtube series "Cartoon Therapy" created by Thomas Sanders
Emil Sinclair, the main character in Demian by Hermann Hesse
Emil Skoda, M.D., a character on the TV crime dramas Law & Order and Law & Order: Special Victims Unit
Emil Svensson, title character of the children's book series Emil i Lönneberga by Astrid Lindgren
Emil Tischbein, title character of the children's books Emil and the Detectives and its sequel, Emil und die Drei Zwillinge (Emil and the Three Twins)

See also
Emil (disambiguation)
Aemilius (disambiguation)
Emilio (given name)

Masculine given names
Swedish masculine given names

English masculine given names
Estonian masculine given names
German masculine given names
Bulgarian masculine given names
Romanian masculine given names